MRML may refer to:

 Munshiram Manoharlal, Indian publisher
Medical Reality Markup Language